Yellen is a surname. Notable people with the surname include:
 Alexander Yellen  (born 1981), American cinematographer
 Jack Yellen (1892–1991), American lyricist
 Janet Yellen (born 1946), American economist, current U.S. Treasury Secretary and former Federal Reserve Chair
 Larry Yellen (born 1943), American baseball pitcher
 Linda Yellen (born 1949), American director, producer and writer of film and television
 Sherman Yellen (born 1932), American playwright

See also
 
 Jelen
 Yellin